Benjamin Marcus Alexander Dixon (born 16 September 1974) is an English footballer. Initially a left-winger, he converted first to a left-back and then a centre-half. He plays for Boston Town.

Career
Dixon began his career with Lincoln City in 1992. In four years with the Imps, he made 43 league appearances.

In 1996, he joined Blackpool, then managed by Gary Megson, who had noticed Dixon during his brief spell with Lincoln. He remained at Bloomfield Road for two years, making thirteen appearances.

Dixon then moved to Singapore to play for Woodlands Wellington. Upon completion of the 1998 S-League season, he returned to England and joined Whitby Town where he spent six seasons, making a total of 237 appearances scoring 15 goals.

Dixon joined Gainsborough Trinity at the start of the 2004–05 season but his stay was brief, moving on to Ossett Town in October 2004. In January 2005, he moved to Lincoln United and remained at Ashby Avenue until the summer of 2007 when he followed his manager, John Wilkinson, and many of the United squad in moving to Grantham Town. It was initially thought that Dixon would retire from football in June 2008 following Grantham's unsuccessful bid for promotion. Dixon transferred to Boston Town midway through the 2008–2009 season.

References

External links

1974 births
Living people
Sportspeople from Lincoln, England
English footballers
Association football defenders
Lincoln City F.C. players
Witton Albion F.C. players
Blackpool F.C. players
Woodlands Wellington FC players
Whitby Town F.C. players
Gainsborough Trinity F.C. players
Ossett Town F.C. players
Lincoln United F.C. players
Grantham Town F.C. players
Boston Town F.C. players
English Football League players
Singapore Premier League players
Northern Premier League players